Khao Sam Roi Yot National Park is a marine national park in Kui Buri District, Prachuap Khiri Khan Province, Thailand. It covers 61,300 rai ~  of which 13,050 rai ~  are marine areas. The park was established in 1966, and was the first coastal national park of Thailand. The park includes Thailand's largest freshwater marsh.

Geography
Between the hills are freshwater marshes. Several of these marshes were converted into shrimp farms, as only 22,000 rai ~  of the total 43,000 rai ~  of marshes are part of the national park. A portion, 11,000 rai ~ , of these marshes are scheduled to be declared a Ramsar site.

Two white sand beaches are in the park, Hat Laem Sala and Hat Sam Phraya. Hat Laem Sala is 17 km from park headquarters and can be reached from the village Ban Pu either by boat or by climbing up and down over a hill for nearly 30 minutes. Five uninhabited islands lie just offshore. 

The origin of the name "Khao Sam Roi Yot" is undetermined. Local lore has it that it means 'mountain with 300 peaks', or the range had been an island where 300 survivors from a sinking Chinese junk sought refuge, or the range was named after a local plant called sam roi yot.

Phraya Nakhon Cave
Visitors can go to the cave by renting a boat or by walking across Tian Mountain. Its most famous early visitor was King Chulalongkorn.

There is a water well at the foot of the mountain known as Phraya Nakhon Well. It is made of baked clay bricks in a trapezoidal shape.

Phraya Nakhon is a large cave which has a hole in the ceiling allowing sunlight to penetrate. At the top of the hole, there is a stone bridge known as "death bridge" because many wild animals have fallen to their deaths from it.

Khuha Kharuehat Pavilion is a historic site built for King Chulalongkorn's visit to the region in 1890. At certain times during certain months, the sun will shine directly on it. The pavilion has since become the symbol of the Prachuap Khiri Khan Province. Later kings also visited the cave, including King Vajiravudh and King Bhumibol Adulyadej.

Klong Khao Daeng
Klong Khao Daeng is a  stream running deep into mangrove forests at one end and at its mouth freshwater and seawater collide. The mangroves consist of the samae thalay (grey mangrove), kongkang bai lek (true mangrove), kongkang bai yai (red mangrove), and chakhram (herbaceous seepweed).

Climate

The temperature in winter (between October - February) ranges from 18˚C to 25˚C.

The temperature in summer (between March - May) ranges from 23˚C to 32˚C.

The temperature in the monsoon season (between June - September) ranges from 20˚C to 30˚C.

Fauna
The park is home to a variety of birds, including the common kingfisher, the black-capped kingfisher, the collared kingfisher, the little heron, the little egret, and the Javan pond-heron. Wildlife found in the mangroves includes pla teen ([mudskippers]), pu kam dab (fiddler crabs), ling samae (the crab-eating macaque), collared kingfisher (nok kin pieo), snapping shrimp (kung deed khan), mud creeper (hoi khika), and oysters (hoi nangrom). Rare animals in the park include the mainland serow (Nemorhaedus sumatraensis), dusky langurs (Trachypithecus obscurus), fishing cats (Prionailurus viverrinus), as well as many bird species. At sea, Irrawaddy dolphins (Orcaella brevirostris) are sometimes seen.

History
Khao Sam Roi Yot was probably where King Mongkut hosted European guests on 18 August 1868 to observe a total solar eclipse. The king was interested in astronomy and had calculated the date and location of the eclipse himself. His calculations proved better—by about two seconds—than those of French astronomers, who acknowledged his accuracy. He contracted malaria, possibly during that event, and died on 1 October.

The national park was created on 28 June 1966, 
with an original area of 38,300 rai ~ . It was enlarged with 23,000 rai ~  on 1 April 1982.

Archaeology 
The discovery of 3,000 years old cave paintings was announced by archaeologists from the Fine Arts Office in May in 2020. Some of the depicted pictures are still visible and clear, while some paintings were damaged by limestone etching. According to archeologist Kannika Premjai, paintings describe humanlike figures with accessories on their bodies, hunting scenes with bow and arrow. Moreover, there is also an animal figure seems to be serow (a goat-like mammal found regionally) found among the drawings. In October 2020, more rock art was discovered in unmapped caves in Sam Roi Yot National Park, dating back to between 2,000 to 3,000 years ago.

See also
List of national parks of Thailand
List of Protected Areas Regional Offices of Thailand

References

Further reading 
 Denis Gray, Collin Piprell, Mark Graham: National Parks of Thailand. Communications Resources Ltd., Bangkok 1991,

External links

ASEAN Regional Centre for Biodiversity Conservation
Bangkok Post article in the land use controversies
thaibirding.com on Khao Sam Roi Yot National Park
Visit Phraya Nakhon Cave (Thai)
Phraya Nakhon Cave – Prachuaptown (Thai)

National parks of Thailand
Ramsar sites in Thailand
Protected areas established in 1966
Tenasserim Hills
Geography of Prachuap Khiri Khan province
Tourist attractions in Prachuap Khiri Khan province
1966 establishments in Thailand